Bourg is a census-designated places in Terrebonne Parish, Louisiana, United States. It is part of the Houma–Bayou Cane–Thibodaux Metropolitan Statistical Area.

Demographics

Education
Terrebonne Parish School District operates public schools. Schools with Bourg addresses include Bourg Elementary School (PK-4) and South Terrebonne High School (9-12).

WMA
Access to the Pointe-aux-Chenes Wildlife Management Area (WMA) can be made through Bourg, LA 24, and down LA 55 or LA 665.

References

Unincorporated communities in Terrebonne Parish, Louisiana
Unincorporated communities in Louisiana
Census-designated places in Houma – Thibodaux metropolitan area